General Girolamo Ramorino (8 April 1792 – 22 May 1849) was born in Genoa, in northern Italy.

Career
In the Napoleonic Wars, he fought under Napoleon in Russia.

He later took part in the 1821 Piedmont uprising in Italy.

In 1830–31, Ramorino aided the Polish insurgents in their November 1830 Uprising.

From the mid-1830s, he helped other revolutionaries such as Mazzini plan the 1848 revolutions.  He will forever be known as an incompetent general due to the part he played when asked to arrange for an army to arrive from Paris to aid a rising; it transpired that he had gambled away his money and that no help would be forthcoming.  In the revolutions, he took charge of a Piedmontese division.

In 1849 he was accused of disobeying orders before the Battle of Novara, whose outcome sounded the death knell for the Italian revolutions.  That same year, he was executed. Upon his own request he was allowed to command the shooting squad himself.

See also
Adam Jerzy Czartoryski

References

1792 births
1849 deaths
Military personnel from Genoa
Italian generals
Generals of the November Uprising
Italian military personnel of the Napoleonic Wars